Juma Santos, also known as Jumma Santos (December 27, 1948 – September 1, 2007), born James R. Riley, was a percussionist and master drummer known for his extensive work over four decades with African music, Caribbean music, jazz, fusion and R&B artists.

Juma Santos (born James Reginald Riley) combined and fused styles and playing techniques of various African musical instruments, experimenting with rhythms, songs, and chants with modern jazz harmonies and melodic forms and structures.  His career included performing with many noted artists on projects of historical significance, including recording on more than 75 albums.

Santos recorded on Miles Davis's Bitches Brew and toured with Davis for a year. He also toured and recorded with Nina Simone, David Sanborn and Taj Mahal.  Other performance residencies include stints with Ahmad Jamal, Dave Liebman, Pee Wee Ellis, Jack DeJohnette, Gato Garcia, Don Alias, Freddie Hubbard, the Fabulous Rhinestones, Harvey Brooks, Roy Ayers, Don Moye, and his own groups, Rosewater Foundation, Afro Jazz Messengers, the Pan-African Drum Ensemble, the Jumma Society and Sounds of the Urban Forest. Juma can be seen performing with Nina Simone in the academy award winning documentary Summer of Soul.

He taught a generation of aspiring Afro-Cuban percussionists in NYC in the 1990s (at the Fareta School of African Dance and Drum) and in Detroit in the 2000s.
 
Juma Santos was also a fine photographer/painter who had had several successful exhibitions.

He died in September 2007, in Chicago, apparently of complications from malaria, at the age of 59 and mainly because his religious beliefs did not allow him to use traditional Western medicine when he became ill.

Discography

As sideman
1969:  Bitches Brew, Miles Davis
1969:  Black Gold, Nina Simone
1971:  Ubiquity, Roy Ayers
1971: Paul Pena, Paul Pena
1971: Compost, Compost
1972:  He's Coming, Roy Ayers
1973: Life is Round, Compost
1973: Geechee Recollections, Marion Brown
1973: Lawrence of Newark, Larry Young
1973: Andy Pratt, Andy Pratt
1973: Live at Berkeley, Nina Simone
1976: Light'n Up, Please!, Dave Liebman
1976:  David Sanborn, David Sanborn
1977:  Beyond the Rain, Chico Freeman
1979:  The Love Connection, Freddie Hubbard
1984: Georgia Blue, Julius Arthur Hemphill and the JAH Band, [Minor Music 1984]
1992: Family Portrait, Victor Lewis

References

1948 births
2007 deaths
American jazz drummers
Deaths from malaria
Infectious disease deaths in Illinois
20th-century American drummers
American male drummers
American jazz percussionists
Conga players
Tambourine players
American marimbists
20th-century American male musicians
American male jazz musicians
Compost (band) members